Freedom and Democracy Party (Turkish: Özgürlük ve Demokrasi Partisi, ÖZDEP) was a pro-Kurdish rights party in Turkey. The party was created in October 1992 after the People's Labor Party (HEP) was banned. Four months after its formation, ÖZDEP was banned by the constitutional court of Turkey on charges of supporting self-determination and for conducting bureaucratic services in the Kurdish language. In an appeal to the European Court of Human Rights, Turkey was ordered to pay compensation for the closure of the party in December 1999.

See also
Racism in Turkey
Kurds in Turkey
Human rights of Kurdish people in Turkey

References

Banned Kurdish parties in Turkey
Banned socialist parties
Political parties established in 1992
Political parties disestablished in 1993
Regionalist parties